Parornix melanotella is a moth of the family Gracillariidae. It is known from Canada (Québec) the United States (Pennsylvania, Maine and Vermont).

The larvae feed on Crataegus species. They mine the leaves of their host plant.

References

Parornix
Moths of North America
Moths described in 1907